Pararhytiphora dispar is a species of beetle in the family Cerambycidae. It was described by Thomas Blackburn in 1894, originally under the genus Iphiastus. It is known from Australia. It contains the varietas Pararhytiphora dispar var. fasciata.

References

Pteropliini
Beetles described in 1894
Taxa named by Thomas Blackburn (entomologist)